Bolshiye Shady (Olo Şaźı) is a rural locality (a village) and the administrative centre of Bolsheshadinsky Selsoviet, Mishkinsky District, Bashkortostan, Russia. The population was 533 as of 2010. There are 9 streets.

Geography 
Bolshiye Shady is located 26 km northwest of Mishkino (the district's administrative centre) by road. Ishtybayevo is the nearest rural locality.

References 

Rural localities in Mishkinsky District